The Acropolis International Tournament 2011 was a basketball tournament held in OAKA Indoor Hall in Athens, Greece, from August 23 until August 25, 2011. This was the 25th edition of the Acropolis International Basketball Tournament. The four participating teams were Greece, Brigham Young University, Bulgaria and Italy.

Venues

Participating teams

 BYU Cougars

Standings 

|-bgcolor="gold"

|}

Results 
All times are local Central European Summer Time (UTC+2).

Final standing

References

External links
Acropolis Cup 2011 Results

Acropolis
Acropolis International Basketball Tournament
2011–12 in Greek basketball
2011–12 in Bulgarian basketball
2011–12 in Italian basketball